{{DISPLAYTITLE:C6H11NO2}}
The molecular formula C6H11NO2 may refer to:

 Cyclohexyl nitrite, an organic nitrite
 Cycloleucine, an unnatural amino acid
 Isonipecotic acid, a GABAA receptor partial agonist
 Nipecotic acid, a GABA uptake inhibitor
 Nitrocyclohexane, a nitro compound
 Pipecolic acid, a small organic molecule which accumulates in pipecolic acidemia
 Vigabatrin, an antiepileptic drug